Digital Hardcore Recordings (DHR) is a record label set up in 1994 by Alec Empire, Joel Amaretto and Pete Lawton. Most of the music is recorded in Berlin, though the label is based in London where the records are mastered and manufactured. The funds for setting up the label came from the payment which Atari Teenage Riot received for their aborted record deal with the major UK record label Phonogram Records.

The label is acclaimed for its articulation of the digital hardcore style of music - "Digital hardcore" is used not only to refer to the record label itself, but to the genre that its artists helped to create.  Several artists to this day, though not affiliated with the DHR label, would classify themselves as digital hardcore, tangible proof of DHR's solid influence on the industrial/electronic scene as well as on the rock/metal-scene.

In 1995 DHR released its first album (they had previously only released a 12" in 1994) and a compilation, Harder Than The Rest. Digital Hardcore Festival events were held in several German cities, and the Suicide Club in Berlin, run by a friend of ATR, provided a platform to new bands such as EC8OR. The word about DHR spread to underground scenes in Japan, USA, Australia and Europe. BBC Radio 1 DJ John Peel heard about DHR and invited Atari Teenage Riot to play in London.

In 1996 DHR made a distribution deal for the US on the Beastie Boys' Grand Royal label then DHR toured there and South East Asia. Atari Teenage Riot toured in support of bands such as Jon Spencer Blues Explosion, Beck, Rage Against the Machine and Wu-Tang Clan. In 1997 Atari Teenage Riot, Shizuo and Ec8or embarked on a Digital Hardcore tour of the United States.

In 1998 DHR established an office in New York City and its studios in Berlin. In the ensuing years Atari Teenage Riot came under a lot of pressure, amongst other reasons because of member Carl Crack's psychosis (and subsequent death). By 2000 the Berlin music scene in which DHR had found its place was declining, Atari Teenage Riot disbanded and no new groups or artists were being signed to DHR. At the end of that year Alec Empire decided to restructure DHR and began work on a new album.

In 2002 Empire released Intelligence and Sacrifice and played shows in the US. He became aware of the growing digital hardcore scene there, releasing a compilation of American bands on DHR entitled Don’t Fuck With Us!

Although at present the label is seen as less influential than it was in the 1990s, DHR is nevertheless recognised for its role in the emergence of breakcore, as well as promoting music its artists believed in.

Discography

EPs, singles and videos

Albums

DHR Limited series

DHR online shop exclusives

DHR official tape series

See also
 List of record labels
 List of electronic music record labels

References

External links
Digital Hardcore Recordings at discogs.com

Digital Hardcore Records
Electronic music record labels
Record labels established in 1994
Industrial record labels